Dario Bijelić (born 18 May 2004) is a Croatian professional footballer who plays as a right-back for 2. Liga club Liefering.

International career
Bijelić has represented Croatia at youth international level.

Career statistics

Club

Notes

References

2004 births
Living people
Austrian people of Croatian descent
Croatian footballers
Austrian footballers
Association football defenders
2. Liga (Austria) players
FC Liefering players
FC Red Bull Salzburg players